Acinetobacter populi is a bacterium from the genus of Acinetobacter which has been isolated from a canker of the tree Populus x euramericana in Puyang in China.

References

Moraxellaceae
Bacteria described in 2015